Mohammad Shahrol bin Saperi (born 12 October 1984), known as Shahrol Saperi is a former Malaysian footballer who is currently the fitness coach for Sarawak FA U-19.

Shahrol played with Sarawak since 2001 when he joined their Malaysia President Cup in Sarawak President's Under-21 team and was promoted to the senior squad in 2004. He had also served as the team captain.

His younger brother Hafis Saperi is also a footballer who is currently played for Kuching FA in Malaysia M3 League.

Honours

Club
Sarawak
 Malaysia Premier League 
Promotion: 2011

References

Malaysian footballers
Sarawak FA players
Living people
1984 births
People from Kuching
People from Sarawak
Malaysia Super League players
Association football midfielders